Portugalete is a town lying to the west of Bilbao in the province of Biscay in the Autonomous Community of Basque Country, northern Spain.

The town has 45,766 inhabitants (2019 census) and is part of Bilbao's metropolitan area. It is located at the mouth of the Estuary of Bilbao, on the left bank. Its land area is only 3.21 km², resulting in a population density of 15,908.4 persons/km², the fifth-most densely populated municipality in Spain (following Mislata, L'Hospitalet de Llobregat, Benetússer, and Santa Coloma de Gramenet).

In 1300 Portugalete became the main competitor port for Bilbao, but it lost its predominant position in 1511 when the trade privileges were granted to the Port of Bilbao instead of Portugalete.

Despite its name, it is not near the Spanish border with Portugal and its name is not etymologically related with that country: it derives, instead, from a phonetic adaptation of its Basque name (Portu-Ugaldeta) (edges of the port) to the Spanish language.

The transporter bridge

The city has the Vizcaya Bridge, a transporter bridge. The car ferry is suspended from a frame by wires attached to wheels on tracks above the cabin and moves from one side of the River Nervión to the other (Getxo) via a traction system.

This bridge was declared a World Heritage Site on 13 July 2006.

Events and festivals

San Roque Festivals
The festivals officially last four days, from 14 to 17 August, the main festivities occurring on 15 and 16 August, San Roque Day. The people sing the song "La Diana Portugaluja" outside the Town Hall in the morning of 15 August to mark the eve of San Roque Day.

Monuments
Monuments in Portugalete include the 15th century Basílica of Santa María, Salazar's Tower, and the town hall in addition to the old mediaeval arches and streets in the older part of the city.

See also
 Asti-Leku Ikastola, a private school in Portugalete.
 Club Portugalete, a football club based in the town.
 Palacio del Marqués de Portugalete, an opulent residence that once stood in Portugalete.
 Portugalete (Metro Bilbao), the town's central metro station.

References

External links
Official website (in Basque and Spanish)
PORTUGALETE in the Bernardo Estornés Lasa - Auñamendi Encyclopedia (Euskomedia Fundazioa) 

Municipalities in Biscay
Populated places established in the 1320s
Estuary of Bilbao
Fishing communities